Yde may refer to the following notable people:
Given name
Yde Schloenbach Blumenschein (1882–1963), Brazilian poet and chronicler

Surname
 Breanna Yde (born 2003), American actress
 Emil Yde (1900–1968), American baseball player
Ole Yde (born 1978), Danish fashion designer